The 14503 / 14504 Kalka–Shri Mata Vaishno Devi Katra Express is an Express train belonging to Northern Railway zone that runs between  and  in India. It is currently being operated with 14503/14504 train numbers on bi-weekly basis.

Service

The 14503/Kalka–Shri Mata Vaishno Devi Katra Express has an average speed of 50 km/hr and covers 479 km in 9h 35m. The 14504/Shri Mata Vaishno Devi Katra–Kalka Express has an average speed of 46 km/hr and covers 479 km in 10h 30m.

Coach composite 

The train has standard ICF rakes with max speed of 110 kmph. The train consists of 16 coaches :
 1 AC II Tier
 2 AC III Tier
 5 Sleeper Coaches
 6 General
 2 Seating cum Luggage Rake

Route & Halts

Traction
Both trains are hauled by a Ghaziabad Loco Shed based WAP-7 Electric locomotive from Kalka to Katra and vice versa.

Rake sharing
The train sharing its rake with 22455/22456 Sainagar Shirdi–Kalka Express.

See also 
 Kalka railway station
 Shri Mata Vaishno Devi Katra railway station
 Sainagar Shirdi–Kalka Express

Notes

References

External links 
 14503/Kalka - Shri Mata Vaishno Devi Katra Express
 14504/Shri Mata Vaishno Devi Katra - Kalka Express

Transport in Kalka
Transport in Katra, Jammu and Kashmir
Express trains in India
Rail transport in Jammu and Kashmir
Rail transport in Chandigarh
Rail transport in Haryana
Rail transport in Punjab, India
Railway services introduced in 2015